Joseph M. Scruggs (May 30, 1888 – March 20, 1964) was a provincial politician from Alberta, Canada. He served as a member of the Legislative Assembly of Alberta from 1959 to 1963 sitting with the Social Credit caucus in government.

Political career
Scruggs ran for a seat to the Alberta Legislature in the 1959 Alberta general election as a Social Credit candidate in the electoral district of Dunvegan. He defeated three other candidates in a hotly contested race taking just under 40% of the popular vote.

Scruggs retired from provincial office at dissolution of the Assembly in 1963.

References

External links
Legislative Assembly of Alberta Members Listing

Alberta Social Credit Party MLAs
1888 births
1964 deaths